Series 3 may refer to:

 3 Skypephone Series, the mobile phone series
 Apple Watch Series 3, smart watch
 Aston Martin Lagonda Series 3, the automobile model
 Aston Martin V8 Series 3, the automobile model
 BMW 3 Series, the automobile model line
 GeForce 3 series, line of nVidia video cards
 GP3 Series, motor racing series
 Land Rover series#Series_III, motor vehicle
 Psion Series 3, handheld computer line
 Samsung Series 3 Chromebox, a line of minicomputers
 Scania 3-series, the truck model line
 South African Class 6E1, Series 3, electric locomotive series
 Super3 Series, motor racing series

See also
 300 series (disambiguation)
 System 3 (disambiguation)
 Model 3 (disambiguation)